Marga is a commune in Caraș-Severin County, western Romania with a population of 1.300 people. It is composed of two villages, Marga and Vama Marga (Vámosmárga). It is situated in the historical region of Banat.

References

Communes in Caraș-Severin County
Localities in Romanian Banat